Ruthless! The Musical is an all-female musical with music by Marvin Laird and book and lyrics by Joel Paley that spoofs Broadway musicals, like Gypsy and Mame, and movies such as The Bad Seed and All About Eve. The musical premiered Off-Broadway in 1992.

Production history
The musical opened Off-Broadway at the Players Theatre on March 13, 1992 and closed January 24, 1993 after 342 performances. It was directed by Joel Paley with musical direction by Marvin Laird. (Laird was later the musical director for the Broadway revivals of Annie Get Your Gun (1999) and Gypsy (2003)).  The central role of Tina was played by Laura Bell Bundy, with Natalie Portman and Britney Spears as understudies.

Ruthless! The Musical was then produced in Los Angeles at the Canon Theatre, where it opened on November 15, 1993. A recording was made by the 1993 Los Angeles cast on Varèse Sarabande and released on March 29, 1994.

The show won the 1993 New York Outer Critics Circle Award for Best Off-Broadway Musical.

The musical has had a number of professional productions, particularly in regional theatre. Ruthless! The Musical played at the Colony Theatre, Miami, Florida, in January and February 1995, directed by Paley.

The show had its UK premiere in 2002 at London's Stratford Circus Theatre, directed by Omar F. Okai and produced by Simon James Collier, where it won 5 Musical Stages Awards.

The musical ran for nine performances in September 2014 at the Triad Theater in New York City to benefit Broadway Cares/Equity Fights AIDS. The production returned to the Triad in October 2014.

The musical opened Off-Broadway at St. Luke's Theatre on June 25, 2015 (previews), officially on July 13, with direction by Joel Paley, musical direction by Ricky Romano, and music supervision by Marvin Laird. For this production, Paley said: "...In this staging, we’ve done away with the intermission and have streamlined it into 90 minutes that is roller-coaster sharp and fast." The cast features Kim Maresca (Judy Denmark), Tori Murray (Tina), Peter Land  (Sylvia St. Croix), Tracy Jai Edwards (Louise), Andrea McCullough (Miss Thorn), and Rita McKenzie (Lita Encore).

The musical made its West End premiere at the Arts Theatre opening on 27 March (previews from 16 March) for a limited run until 23 June 2018, directed by Richard Fitch, choreography by Rebecca Howell and music supervision by Gareth Valentine. A recording of the London production was released by BroadwayHD in 2019.

Synopsis
Act I

Judy Denmark, a bland housewife, is the mother of talented eight-year-old Tina (“Tina’s Mother”), who declares that she was “Born to Entertain."  At the suggestion that she should postpone her stage ambitions to be a normal child, she replies, "I've had a normal childhood. It's time to move on."  Sylvia St. Croix, an overbearing and sleazy agent, encourages Tina to audition for the school play, Pippi in Tahiti, The Musical, feeding her thirst for stardom (“Talent”).  Third-grade teacher and frustrated actress, Miss Myrna Thorn, directs Pippi (“Teaching Third Grade”).  She casts an untalented (but parentally connected) girl, Louise Lerman, for the lead, making Tina the frustrated understudy (“The Audition/ To Play This Part”).  After "begging nicely and saying please," Tina "accidentally" hangs Louise from the catwalk with a jump rope so that she can play Pippi. Lita Encore, Judy's adoptive mother (and Tina's grandmother), a tart-tongued theatre critic who "Hates Musicals", shows up to review the premiere of Pippi in Tahiti; and, In a series of revelations, we learn that Judy is the daughter of Ruth Del Marco, a Broadway star from the past who was believed to have committed suicide because of bad reviews from Lita Encore (“Where Tina Gets It From/ That Name”).  Judy recognizes that she herself is talented ("Angel Mom”).

Act II

Once Tina's crime is discovered, she is sent away to the Daisy Clover School for Psychopathic Ingenues.  Former housewife Judy Denmark is now a success on Broadway as diva Ginger Del Marco, but the world wants to know where she came from.  "Modern Thespian" reporter Emily Block directs a pointed interview at Judy and discovers not only her housewife past but that she has a child.  Tina is released from serving her time and comes back to Ginger's fabulous “Penthouse Apartment” (and her jealous assistant, Eve).  Tina seems to be reformed, but Ginger sees through the act ("you're not that good") and calls her bluff. Mother and daughter face off for the limelight.  Sylvia re-enters, wanting nothing more than to take Tina with her. She reveals that she is Ruth Del Marco, and Ginger's mother (“Parents and Children”). She did not commit suicide, as was believed, but instead went into hiding. Suddenly, Eve pulls out a gun and after revealing that she is Louise Lerman's ("Act One?") mother Betty Lerman, in a struggle with Ginger Delmarco, is shot dead. Tina then takes the gun that shot Eve and holds it to her mother, asking to be in cast in her new play. At that moment, Lita Encore bursts in, and Sylvia struggles for the gun with Tina and is shot dead. She sings her final song, after which, Lita Encore comments "ah, she could never sing." Sylvia comes back to life one last time and shoots Lita. Ginger then becomes Judy again because of all the extremely stressful events that have taken place. She tells Tina that they'll never set foot on stage again to which Tina responds, "You're right, mother. there's no money in the theater...we're moving to L.A...We'll do a sitcom!" Tina then shoots her mother and begins to declare, gun in hand, that there's no money in Broadway when she is interrupted by Miss Block, who returns looking for her pad and pen. Tina shoots her and finishes explaining that there's no money in Broadway and that she's moving to Hollywood to get a series.

Characters and original cast
This list shows the original casts of the principal productions

Note: Though the show was written for an all-female cast, it has become somewhat of a tradition to have the role of Sylvia St. Croix performed by a man simply because Joel Vig gave the best audition for the original 1992 production.

Songs

Act I
 Prologue – Orchestra, Sylvia
 Tina's Mother – Judy
 Born To Entertain – Tina
 Talent – Sylvia
 To Play This Part – Tina
 Teaching Third Grade – Miss Thorn  
 Where Tina Gets It From – Judy, Sylvia
 The Pippi Song –  Louise
 Kisses And Hugs – Tina, Judy
 Teaching Third Grade (Reprise) – Miss Thorn
 Talent (Reprise #1) – Sylvia
 I Hate Musicals – Lita
 Angel Mom – Judy, Tina 

Act II
 Entr'acte/Montage – Orchestra, Judy, Tina
 A Penthouse Apartment – Eve
 It Will Never Be That Way Again – Ginger
 I Want the Girl – Sylvia
 There's More To Life – Tina (added for the 2018 West End production)
 Parents And Children – Ginger, Tina
 Ruthless! – Ginger, Sylvia, Tina
 Talent (Reprise #2) – Tina
 Ruthless! (Reprise) – Company
 Unkie's Muncle – (performed by Bernadette Peters and used as a recording in the production)(Based on the 1994 Los Angeles cast recording)

Awards and nominations
Drama Desk Awards (1991–92)
 Laura Bundy—Outstanding Actress - Musical (nominee) 
 Donna English—Outstanding Actress - Musical (nominee) 
 Joel Paley—Outstanding Director - Musical (nominee)
 Joel Paley—Outstanding Lyrics (winner)
 "Ruthless"—Outstanding Musical (nominee)

1993 Outer Critics Circle Award
Best Off-Broadway Musical - (winner)

2002 Musical Stages Magazine Awards, London
Best Musical Production - Fringe - (winner)
Best Director - Omar F. Okai - (winner)
Best Actress in a Musical - Lisa Baird - (winner)
Best Actor in a Musical - Paul L Martin - (winner)
Best Writers/Lyricists/Composers of New Work - (winner)

Notes

References
 Plot summary, cast list and other information about Ruthless!

External links
 
 
 Ruthless! song list and plot at guidetomusicaltheatre.com
 "New York Times" review, May 17, 1992
 An interview with Laird and Paley, talkinbroadway.com circa July 2003
 Topeka Capital-Journal review with a discussion of the antecedents to Ruthless!

Off-Broadway musicals
1992 musicals
West End musicals